The Goldschmidt family is a family of German Jewish descent, originally from Frankfurt am Main, known for their success in banking and finance. 

With origins tracing back to the 15th century, most members were forced to leave Frankfurt after the 1614 Fettmilch uprising, and did not return until the 18th century.

The family was interwoven particularly with the Rothschild family, the Bischoffsheim family of Mainz, and with the Bartolome Family, one of the richest families of Monaco. The  Bischoffsheim and Goldschmidt families conjointly managed the Bischoffsheim, Goldschmidt & Cie bank, which was eventually merged into Banque de Crédit et de Dépôt des Pays-Bas in 1863, the forerunner to BNP Paribas.

On 6 September 1903, Maximilian Goldschmidt was elevated to the title of Baron von Goldschmidt-Rothschild in Prussia, by Emperor Wilhelm II. Thus, the family became part of the German nobility.

The English branch of the family Anglicised their name to Goldsmith, starting with Frank Goldsmith (1878–1967). Its most famous 20th century member was the billionaire James Goldsmith. The most famous today is Zac Goldsmith, who was MP for Richmond Park. Zac's sister, Jemima, was married to the Pakistani former cricket player turned politician and the former Prime Minister of Pakistan Imran Khan. Members of this branch of the family were also awarded with the title of Baron in Britain and thus belong to British nobility.

Family tree

'Eden Hayum Goldschmidt (1772–1843), banker
 Benedikt Hayum Goldschmidt (1798–1873), banker, founder of  bank, married to Jeannette Kann (1802–1848)
 Leopold Benedict Goldschmidt (1830–1904), banker, married to Regine Bischoffsheim (1834–1905)
 Adolphe Goldschmidt (1838–1918), banker, married to Alice Emma Moses (1844–1922)
  Frank Goldsmith (1878–1967), politician, married to Marcelle Mouiller
 Edward Goldsmith (1928–2009), philosopher, environmentalist
 Clio Goldsmith (1957–) former French actress, married to Mark Shand (1951–2014)
  James Goldsmith (1933–1997), investor, married to María Isabel Patiño y Borbón (–1954), Ginette Lery, and Annabel Vane-Tempest-Stewart
 Jemima Goldsmith (1974–), writer, previously married to Imran Khan, a former cricketer and Prime Minister of Pakistan
 Zac Goldsmith (1975–), politician, married to Alice Miranda Rothschild (1983–), daughter of Amschel Rothschild (1955–1996)
 Ben Goldsmith (1980–), financier, previously married to Kate Emma Rothschild (1982–), daughter of Amschel Rothschild (1955–1996)
 Maximilian Goldschmidt (1843–1940), married to Minna Karoline Freiin von Rothschild, the daughter of Wilhelm Carl von Rothschild (1828–1901)
 Albert Maximilian von Goldschmidt-Rothschild (1879–1941)
 Lili Jeannette von Goldschmidt-Rothschild (1883–1925), married Philipp Schey de Koromla (1881–1957)
 Lucy Georgine Leontine von Goldschmidt-Rothschild (1891–1977), married Edgar Spiegl, Edler von Thurnsee
  Erich Max Benedikt von Goldschmidt-Rothschild (1894–1987), married Countess Veronika Henckel von Donnersmarck
Patrick Maximilien Goldschmidt-Rothschild (b. 1928)
 Amalie Goldschmidt (1804–1887), married to Louis-Raphaël Bischoffsheim (1800–1873), banker
  See Bischoffsheim family
  Henriette Goldschmidt (1812–1892), married to Jonathan-Raphaël Bischoffsheim (1808–1883), banker
  See Bischoffsheim family

See also
 Family of Imran Khan

References

Bibliography
The Goldschmidts, Anthony Allfrey, 1996

German bankers
British bankers
Goldsmith family
Jewish families